A brickfield is an open site where bricks are made. Place names are often formed from the word.

Brickfield, Brickfields or Brickfielder may specifically refer to:

Australia
Brickfielder, an arid wind
Brickfield Hill, an area of Sydney
Brickfields Hiring Depot, a historic building in North Hobart, Tasmania

United Kingdom

England
Brickfields, Bletchley, an area in Buckinghamshire
Brickfields, Worcestershire, an English location
The Brickfields, a sports complex in Devonport, Plymouth, Devon
Brickfield and Long Meadow, a nature reserve in Earls Colne, Essex
Brickfields Meadow, South Norwood, Croydon

Wales
Brickfields Pond, a Welsh lake and nature reserve in Rhyl, Denbighshire
Brickfield Rangers F.C., a football club in Wrexham

Elsewhere
Brickfields, Kuala Lumpur, a neighbourhood in Malaysia
Brickfield Town (now Sandymount), Dublin, Ireland
Brickfield, Trinidad and Tobago, a beach in Couva
Soweto, Gauteng, South Africa. Previously known as Brickfields.

See also
Brickworks, a factory for manufacturing bricks
Brickyard, a place where bricks are made